The Omnicircus was a theater, gallery and performance art space that was established in 1992 by Frank Garvey in San Francisco, California. 

Omnicircus was home to Garvey’s ensemble as well as being an installation of his films, paintings, sculptures, music, photographs, and robots. The OmniCircus shows integrated live acting, music, dance and filmography with sophisticated mechanical actors and midi-controlled, computer animated (VIRpt) performers. 

The OmniCircus was forced to leave its space early in 2015.

References

External links 
 Mr. Roboto: Frank Garvey commands a troupe of radical robots, Andrew Druckenbrod, Pittsburgh Post-Gazette, Mar 4, 2001
 World's End, SF Weekly, Michael Leaverton, Oct 26, 2005 
 The Center for Robotic and Synthetic Performance, The Robotics Institute 
 OmniCircus website

Event venues established in 1988
Robotic art
Theatres completed in 1988